Djall or Dreq is the personification of evil in Albanian mythology and folklore. The name is used also for a demon of fire.

Etymology 
The name djall derives from the Latin diabolus, "devil". Alternative forms are dreqi from the Latin draco, "dragon", satan and shejtan.

See also 
 Dajjal
 En (deity)
 Kulshedra
 Stihi
 Verbti

References

Bibliography 
 
 
 
 

Albanian mythology
Death gods